The Boraida class is a ship class of two replenishment oilers built for the Royal Saudi Navy by CN la Ciotat at Marseille, France. It is a modified version of the French  replenishment ship. They were constructed in 1983 and entered service in 1984. The two ships are based at Jeddah, Saudi Arabia.

Design and description
Two ships of the French  replenishment oilers were ordered by the Royal Saudi Navy in October 1980 to a modified design. They have a complement of 140, with accommodation for 55 cadets.

Each ship has two dual solid/liquid underway transfer stations per side and can replenish one ship per side and one astern. The ships are armed with two turrets with twin Breda Bofors  guns. For weapons control the Boraida class is equipped with two CSEE Naja optronic fire control directors and two CSEE Lynx optical sights and have two Decca navigational radars. They have an aft helicopter deck, and can carry either one Eurocopter AS332 Super Puma or two Eurocopter AS365 Dauphin helicopters. The helicopters can be armed with anti-submarine and anti-ship weapons.

Ships

Construction and career
The two ships were ordered as part of the Sawari programme. Both ships were built at the La Ciotat shipyard in Marseille, France. The lead ship of the class, Boraida, was laid down on 13 April 1982. The ship entered service on 29 February 1984. Yunbou was laid down on 9 October 1983 and entered service on 29 August 1985. They are used primarily as training, depot and maintenance ships. Both ships are based at Jeddah, Saudi Arabia. In 1996–1998, the two ships underwent a major refit by DCNS at Toulon, France. In 2013 an agreement was reached between France and Saudi Arabia for a life-extension program for the two ships. The refit will include the installation of one launcher for Simbad Mistral surface-to-air missiles. The refits will take place in Saudi Arabia.

Citations

References
 
 

Ships of the Royal Saudi Navy
Auxiliary replenishment ship classes